Lemaire (or LeMaire or Le Maire) is a surname. Notable people with the surname include:

 Adrien Lemaire (1852–1902), French botanist
 Alfred Jean Baptiste Lemaire, French military musician
 Axelle Lemaire, (born 1974), French politician
 Bernard Lemaire (born 1936), Canadian businessman
  (1946-2009), French civil servant (prefect)
 Bruno Le Maire (born 1969), French Minister of Food, Agriculture and Fishing
 Christophe Lemaire (full name Christophe Patrice Lemaire, born 1979), French-born jockey
 Charles LeMaire (1897–1985), American costume designer
 Charles Lemaire (explorer), Belgian explorer of the Belgian Congo
 Charles Antoine Lemaire (1800–1871), French botanist and botanical author
 Denise Lemaire (born 1956), former Canadian handball player
 Edward LeMaire (died 1961), American figure skater
 Géry Lemaire (1928-2013), Belgian orchestra conductor and orthodox priest
 Ghislain Lemaire (born 1972), French judoka
 Isaac Le Maire (1558–1624), merchant for the Vereenigde Oostindische Compagnie
 Jacob Le Maire (1585–1616), Dutch explorer and discoverer of Cape Horn
 Jacques Gerard Lemaire (born 1945), former ice hockey centre and former coach of the New Jersey Devils in the National Hockey League
 Jean Lemaire de Belges (c. 1473 – c. 1525), Walloon poet and historian who lived primarily in France
 Jean-Marie Lemaire (born 1936), Belgian Olympic rower
 Madeleine Lemaire (1845–1928), French painter
 Maximiliaan le Maire (1606–1654), Dutch officer for the Vereenigde Oostindische Compagnie
 Paulin Lemaire (born 1882 - died ?), French gymnast
 Philema Lemaire (1856–1932), French politician and a Governor General of Pondicherry in Second French Colonial Empire
 Philippe Joseph Henri Lemaire (1798–1880), French sculptor
 Robert Lemaire (1916–1994), Belgian chess master
 Tabitha Lemaire (born 1977), French-Canadian singer
 Aimée Bologne-Lemaire (1904–1998), Belgian feminist, member of the Resistance, and Walloon activist
 Louis François Auguste Cauchois-Lemaire (1789–1861), French journalist

See also
Lemaire Channel, a strait off Antarctica, named after Charles Lemaire
Le Maire Strait, a strait between Tierra del Fuego and Isla de los Estados, named after Jacob Le Maire

Occupational surnames
French-language surnames